Cameron Adam Snowden Pirouet (born 27 November 1998) is a Jersey born British sport shooter. He has represented Jersey at both the Island Games–at which he holds four games records–and the Commonwealth Games; his best result is a fourth-place finish in the Men's Smallbore Rifle event in 2018.

Biography

Early life and career
Born and raised in Jersey, Pirouet was educated at Victoria College. He represented the school at the schools' championships at Bisley was a member of the British Cadet Rifle Team, more commonly known as the Athelings, for their tour to Canada in 2016. He went on to read Psychology at Cardiff Metropolitan University. 

Pirouet first represented Great Britain in 2017, finishing third in the Junior Men's 50 m Rifle event at the European Shooting Championships held in Baku, Azerbaijan. He is part of British Shooting's high-performance programme.

Senior career
In 2018, Pirouet was selected to represent Jersey at the Commonwealth Games held in Gold Coast, Australia. He finished fourth in the Men's 50 m Rifle 3 Positions event; although failed to qualify for the finals of the Men's 50 m Rifle Prone and 10 m Air Rifle events, placing sixteenth and thirteenth respectively. 

In 2019, Pirouet represented Jersey at the 2019 Island Games held in Gibraltar. He competed in both Air Rifle and Smallbore events, winning five gold medals and breaking four games records. For his performances in 2019, Pirouet was nominated for the Channel Islands Sports Personality of the Year award, the first shooter to be shortlisted since the award's inception in 2002.

Statistics

International competitions

Personal life
Pirouet is right-handed and shoots using his right eye. His father, Richard, is also a sport shooter; he was British pistol champion in 1991 and represented Jersey in the pistol events at the 1990 Commonwealth Games. In 2019, Pirouet was named as Jersey's Sports Person of the Year by the Jersey Sports Council, an honour previously bestowed upon his father Richard in 1991 following the latter's British pistol shooting triumph.

References

1998 births
Shooters at the 2018 Commonwealth Games
British male sport shooters
People educated at Victoria College, Jersey
Living people
Commonwealth Games competitors for Jersey